Love and the Maiden  is an oil painting (previously mistaken for tempera) on canvas by English Pre-Raphaelite artist John Roddam Spencer Stanhope (executed in 1877) that is currently housed at the Fine Arts Museums of San Francisco.

History
Known as one of the "second-generation" of Pre-Raphaelites, Stanhope was among Dante Gabriel Rossetti's mural-painting party at the Oxford Union in 1857, together with Arthur Hughes, John Hungerford Pollen, Valentine Prinsep, Edward Burne-Jones and William Morris. He was a founder member of the Hogarth Club, a direct descendant of the Pre-Raphaelite Brotherhood.

This painting is considered one of Stanhope's best, and represents two radically different artistic phases of his life. Although he began as fervently Pre-Raphaelite in outlook, Stanhope was deeply attracted by the Aesthetic movement during the 1860s. Love and the Maiden is a succinct mingling of these two equally formative phases in his career. Its presence in the 1877 exhibition at the Grosvenor Gallery — Aestheticism's most famous exposé — demonstrates his adherence to the latter movement, whereas the painting's similarity to the work of Edward Burne-Jones and Dante Gabriel Rossetti - the group of dancing women in the background are similar to those portrayed by Rossetti in The Bower Meadow (1871–72) - betray Stanhope's Pre-Raphaelite background.

During his time in Oxford in 1857, Stanhope wrote that he spent most days painting with Burne-Jones; possibly as a result of this, a great deal of Burne-Jones' influence can be seen in his work - although it could be argued that Burne-Jones also drew ideas from Stanhope's work. The androgynous physiques, Grecian-style draperies and facial expressions depicted in Love and the Maiden are classic Burne-Jones hallmarks, even though the facial similarities probably also arose from use of the same models.

See also
 English art
 List of Pre-Raphaelite paintings

References

Further reading
 Hilto, Timoth, The Pre-Raphelites, Thames and Hudson (1970).
 Robinson, Michael, The Pre-Raphaelites, Flame Tree Publishing (2007).
 Todd, Pamela, Pre-Raphaelites at Home, Watson-Giptill Publications, (2001).

External links
Art sales: Stanhope's maiden tells a tale article on The Telegraph, 27 January 2003
John Roddam Spencer Stanhope, artist (Victorian Art in Britain)
Love and the Maiden on victorianweb.org
John Roddam Spencer Stanhope by Lewis Carroll (National Portrait Gallery)

Pre-Raphaelite paintings
1877 paintings
Paintings in the collection of the Fine Arts Museums of San Francisco
Dance in art